Vetulicolida is one of the two classes of the enigmatic extinct phylum Vetulicolia. It contains one order, Vetulicolata, which is divided into two families, Vetulicolidae and Didazoonidae.

References

Vetulicolia